Pilling is a civil parish in the Wyre district of Lancashire, England.  It contains seven buildings that are recorded in the National Heritage List for England as designated listed buildings.  Of these, two are at Grade II*, the middle grade, and the others are at Grade II, the lowest grade.  The parish includes the village of Pilling, the hamlet of Stake Pool and the surrounding countryside.  The listed buildings comprise two farmhouses, two churches, a house, a hotel and a boundary stone.


Key

Buildings

References

Citations

Sources

Lists of listed buildings in Lancashire
Buildings and structures in the Borough of Wyre